Viper is a steel roller coaster located in the Baja Ridge area of Six Flags Magic Mountain in Valencia, California. Viper is the last operating roller coaster with seven inversions to be built by American manufacturer Arrow Dynamics. The other two, Shockwave at Six Flags Great America and the Great American Scream Machine at Six Flags Great Adventure, were demolished in 2002 and 2010, respectively. The roller coaster replaced a HUSS ride type named Condor.

History
In November 1989, Six Flags Magic Mountain announced that Viper would be added to the park. The ride opened on April 7, 1990.

A week after opening, Viper was shut down. Instead of replacing the links, a new chain had to be ordered. A trim brake was also installed after the first loop. The ride would reopen a few days later.

In August 2018, Viper closed for an extended refurbishment. On December 22, 2018, Viper reopened to the public with new modifications.

Ride experience
After exiting the station, the train begins climbing the  chain lift hill. At the top, the train curves into the  drop and enters a  vertical loop. The train then makes a sharp left, entering two additional vertical loops and climbing into the mid-course brake run. This is followed by a zig-zag into a Batwing element, where the riders experience a half-corkscrew followed by a half loop. The train then proceeds into another half loop and half corkscrew, sending it in the opposite direction. An on-ride camera photographs riders in the middle of this element. This is followed by a right turn and two corkscrews which invert the riders twice. The track leads into a flat section followed by an s-curve drop and rise into the final brake run, before turning right and returning to the station.

Records
When Viper opened in 1990, it was the tallest and fastest looping coaster in the world. The height record for the tallest vertical loop lasted until 2000, with the opening of Superman: Krypton Coaster at Six Flags Fiesta Texas.

In media
Viper was featured in the 1992 film Encino Man, in which it was referred to as "Vaper". Viper also made appearances in the 1993 film True Romance and the 2000 film Space Cowboys, as well as in commercials for Toyota and Cheetos.

Viper was featured in the 1993 episode of Beverly Hills, 90210, "She Came in Through the Bathroom Window", in which the cast goes to Magic Mountain on Senior Skip Day and Andrea conquers her fear of roller coasters. In 2012, it appeared in the Glee episode "Big Brother", when the cast rides it during their visit to the park on senior ditch day. The song "Up, Up, Up" is sung over the experience.

The coaster appears in the video game RollerCoaster Tycoon 2 as part of a recreation of the Six Flags Magic Mountain park.

Viper was also featured in Lucifer season 3, episode 25, when the character Dan rides it after being trapped by one of the suspects in that episode.

Viper was featured in the 2021 Netflix Original "Yes Day".

References

External links

 Viper POV on YouTube

Roller coasters in California
Roller coasters operated by Six Flags
Roller coasters introduced in 1990
Six Flags Magic Mountain
1990 establishments in California